The large-nosed wood turtle (Rhinoclemmys nasuta) is one of nine species of turtle in the genus Rhinoclemmys of the family Geoemydidae. It is found in Colombia and Ecuador.

References

 Tortoise & Freshwater Turtle Specialist Group 1996.  Rhinoclemmys nasuta. 2006 IUCN Red List of Threatened Species. Downloaded 29 July 2007.

Rhinoclemmys
Reptiles of Colombia
Reptiles of Ecuador
Reptiles described in 1902
Taxonomy articles created by Polbot